Kim Yang-chom is a North Korean general and politician.

Biography
He was born in 1944. In 1981 he became Senior Staff of the Department of Engineers of the Ministry of People's Armed Forces. In April 1991 he was appointed to Major. In April 1992 he became head of the department of Engineers in the Ministry of People's Armed Forces and promoted to Lieutenant General. He was elected in September 1998 to the 10th convocation of the Supreme People's Assembly. He was elected again to the 11th convocation in 2003 and 12th convocation in 2009. In October 2005 he was member of the funeral committee of Yon Hyong-muk and in 2008 he was member of the funeral committee of Pak Song-chol.

References

Members of the Supreme People's Assembly
North Korean generals
Workers' Party of Korea politicians
1944 births
Living people